Re-Pair (short for recursive pairing) is a grammar-based compression algorithm that, given an input text, builds a straight-line program, i.e. a context-free grammar generating a single string: the input text. 
The grammar is built by recursively replacing the most frequent pair of characters occurring in the text. 
Once there is no pair of characters occurring twice, the resulting string is used as the axiom of the grammar. 
Therefore, the output grammar is such that all rules but the axiom have two symbols on the right-hand side.

How it works 
Re-Pair was first introduced by NJ. Larsson and A. Moffat in 1999. 
In their paper the algorithm is presented together with a detailed description of the data structures required to implement it with linear time and space complexity.
The experiments showed that Re-Pair achieves high compression ratios and offers good performance for decompression.
However, the major drawback of the algorithm is its memory consumption, which is approximately 5 times the size of the input. Such memory usage is required in order to perform the compression in linear time but makes the algorithm impractical for compressing large files.

The image on the right shows how the algorithm works compresses the string .

Finally, the string  contains no repeated pair and therefore it is used as the axiom of the output grammar.

Data structures 
In order to achieve linear time complexity, Re-Pair requires the following data structures
 A sequence representing the input string. Position  of the sequence contains the i-th symbol of the input string plus two references to other positions in the sequence.
 A priority queue. Each element of the queue is a pair of symbols (terminals or previously defined pairs) that occur consecutively in the sequence. The priority of a pair is given by the number of occurrences of the pair in the remaining sequence. Each time a new pair is created, the priority queue is updated.
 A hash table to keep track of already defined pairs. This table is updated each time a new pair is created or removed.

Since the hash table and the priority queue refer to the same elements (pairs), they can be implemented by a common data structure called PAIR with pointers for the hash table (h_next) and the priority queue (p_next and p_prev). Furthermore, each PAIR points to the beginning of the first (f_pos) and the last (b_pos) occurrences of the string represented by the PAIR in the sequence. The following picture shows an overview of this data structure.

The following two pictures show an example of how these data structures look after the initialization and after applying one step of the pairing process (pointers to NULL are not displayed):

Encoding the grammar 
Once the grammar has been built for a given input string, in order to achieve effective compression, this grammar has to be encoded efficiently.
One of the simplest methods for encoding the grammar is the implicit encoding, which consists on invoking function encodeCFG(X), described below, sequentially on all the axiom's symbols.
Intuitively, rules are encoded as they are visited in a depth-first traversal of the grammar. The first time a rule is visited, its right hand side is encoded recursively and a new code is assigned to the rule. From that point, whenever the rule is reached, the assigned value is written.

num_rules_encoded = 256 // By default, the extended ASCII charset are the terminals of the grammar.

writeSymbol(symbol s) {
  bitslen = log(num_rules_encoded); // Initially 8, to describe any extended ASCII character
  write s in binary using bitslen bits
}

void encodeCFG_rec(symbol s) {
  if (s is non-terminal and this is the first time symbol s appears) {
  	take rule s → X Y;
    write bit 1;
    encodeCFG_rec(X);
    encodeCFG_rec(Y);
    assign to symbol s value ++num_rules_encoded;
  } else {
    write bit 0;
    writeSymbol(terminal/value assigned)
  }
}

void encodeCFG(symbol s) {
  encodeCFG_rec(s);
  write bit 1;
}

Then these generations are encoded subsequently starting from generation . This was the method proposed originally when Re-Pair was first introduced. However, most implementations of Re-Pair use the implicit encoding method due to its simplicity and good performance. Furthermore, it allows on-the-fly decompression.

Versions 
There exists a number of different implementations of Re-Pair. Each of these versions aims at improving one specific aspect of the algorithm, such as reducing the runtime, reducing the space consumption or increasing the compression ratio.

See also 
 Byte pair encoding
 Sequitur algorithm

References 

Compression algorithms
Lossless compression algorithms